John Bell & Croyden is a pharmacy located on Wigmore Street, London. The company dates from 1798 and has been based on its current premises since 1912. It is currently owned by the German Celesio pharmaceuticals group through its LloydsPharmacy subsidiary. It is a Royal Warrant holder.

The shop was refurbished in 2015.

References

External links 
 

Shops in London
Pharmacy brands